Condé Benoist Pallen (December 5, 1858 – May 26, 1929) was an American Catholic editor and author.

Biography
Pallen was born in St. Louis, Missouri in 1858. His father, Montrose A. Pallen, was a physician who was a native of Mississippi. His mother, Anne Benoist Pallen, was a member of an old French family in St. Louis.

He graduated from Georgetown University in 1880 and received a master's degree from Georgetown in 1883 and a Ph.D. from Saint Louis University in 1885. In 1896, Georgetown awarded him an honorary degree, the LL.D.

Pallen died in New York City on May 26, 1929, after suffering from arteriosclerosis. His remains were buried in a family plot at a cemetery in St. Louis.

Works
He was editor of Church Progress and the Catholic World from 1887 to 1897. He was managing editor of the Catholic Encyclopedia from 1904 to 1920. He wrote essays, poetry, and novels. His published works included:

The Philosophy of Literature (1897)
Epochs of Literature (1898)
What is Liberalism? (1889)
New Rubáiyat (1889), poems
The Feast of Thalarchus: A Dramatic Poem (1901)
The Death of Sir Lancelot, and Other Poems (1902)
The Meaning of the Idylls of the King (1904)
The Education of Boys (1916) 
Crucible Island (1919)

Selected articles
 "Scepticism and its Relations to Modern Thought," The Catholic World (1883)
 "A Meaning of Idyls of the King," The Catholic World (1885)
 "A Chat by the Way," The Catholic World (1885)
 "Practical People," The Catholic World (1886)

References

External links

 Works by Condé Benoist Pallen, at Internet Archive

1858 births
1929 deaths
American male journalists
American lexicographers
19th-century American poets
American male poets
Georgetown University alumni
Writers from St. Louis
Saint Louis University alumni
American Roman Catholic poets
20th-century American poets
19th-century American male writers
20th-century American male writers
20th-century American non-fiction writers
Philodemic Society members
Contributors to the Catholic Encyclopedia